Homkund, also spelled Hom Kund, is a high-altitude mountain pond located in Chamoli District, Uttarakhand State, India.

Geography 
Two Himalayan peaks, Trisul and Nanda Ghunti are near Homkund.

Trekking
Homkund has become a trekking destination in recent years and those who trek to Roopkund consider this as another trekking destination, as Homkund is located near Roopkund.

Homkund falls on the popular trek route to Ronti Saddle, a mountain pass between Nanda Ghungti and Trishul. It takes a trek of 3 days from Roopkund crossing the Junargali Pass to reach there. One can also reach there from a different route starting from the village of Sutol and passing by Latakhopri and Chandaniya Ghat.

References

Lakes of Uttarakhand
Geography of Chamoli district
Glacial lakes of India
Hiking trails in Uttarakhand